"Sail On" is a Commodores song written by Lionel Richie from their 1979 album Midnight Magic.  Released as the first of three singles from the album, it was produced by both Commodores and James Anthony Carmichael. The song reached the top ten on both the US and UK music charts that same year. Richie later recorded the song with Tim McGraw for 2012's Tuskegee.

Cash Box described it as "a sparkling ballad."  Billboard called it "a surprising country flavored ballad" and said that "the subdued backing featuring prominent guitar and keyboards and the slick country intonations to Lionel Ritchie's vocal carry the melody." Record Worldcalled it a "beautiful, country-colored ballad."

Track listings
US 7" single
"Sail On"  – 3:57
"Thumpin' Music"  – 3:24

UK 7" single
"Sail On"  – 3:57
"Captain Quick Draw"  – 3:00

Charts

Weekly charts

Year-end charts

References

External links 
 List of cover versions of "Sail On" at SecondHandSongs.com

1979 singles
Commodores songs
Songs written by Lionel Richie
Pop ballads
1979 songs
Motown singles
Song recordings produced by James Anthony Carmichael
Chanté Moore songs
1970s ballads
Cashbox number-one singles